Ve (based on name of the letter  )  is a letter of the Arabic-based Kurdish, Comoro, Wakhi, and Karakhanid alphabets. It is derived from the Arabic letter  with two additional dots. It represents the sound  in the aforementioned uses.

Ve originated as one of the new letters added for the Perso-Arabic alphabet to write New Persian, and it was used for the sound .

It is also frequently used in Israel for transcribing names that have a  sound into Arabic, which is used on Israel's street plates, on signs and labels.

The character is mapped in Unicode under position U+06A4.

The Maghrebi style, used in Northwestern Africa, the dots moved underneath (Unicode U+06A5), because it is based on the other style of :

Similar-looking letter 

If the usage of that letter is not possible for technical restrictions, qāf is often used instead.

See also 

ﭖ - Pe (Persian)
ﭺ - Che (Persian)
گ - Gaf (Persian)
ژ - Zhe (Arabic)
ۋ - Ve

References

Arabic letters